Sir Frederick Clarke (2 August 1880 – 6 January 1952)  was an English educationist who was Director of the Institute of Education in the University of London between 1936 and 1945.

During the 1930s and 1940s, he was also a strong advocate for educational reform in England and Wales. Clarke was fully involved in the public educational debate at the time and a member of a private group of leading educational thinkers known as 'The Moot'. He is known particularly for his book Education and Social Change: an English interpretation from 1940.   Other books include the collection of essays Essays in the Politics of Education (1923) and Freedom in the Educative Society (1948).

Early life
Sir Fred Clarke was born on 2nd August 1880 at High Cogges, Witney, Oxfordshire, his parents were Mr. & Mrs William Clarke.  He moved with his family to Oxford where he attended St. Ebbe's Anglican Boys' School which was a monitorial school and where he was selected to be one of the pupil-teachers (1894-1899).

Sir Fred Clarke obtained a first-class in the Queen's Scholarship which entitled him to subsidised attendance at the Oxford University Day Training Teaching College at St. Catherine's Society for poor scholars who provisioned their own lodgings.  In order to obtain a degree he also studied History in addition to his studies for a Teaching Certificate and hence graduated with a Batchelor of Arts with first-class honours for his four year degree course (1899-1903).

Personal life 
Sir Fred Clark married Edith Annie Gilliams in 1907. He had two daughters: Anna Clarke and Claudia Clarke.

Career 
The major highlights of Fred Clarke's career as an educationist were: - 
 Senior Master of Method at York Diocesan Training College, 1903-1906
 Professor of Education at Hartley University College, Southampton, 1906-1911
 Professor of Education at the University of Cape Town, South Africa, from 1911 to 1918
 Dean of Faculty of Education, at the University of Cape Town, South Africa, 1918-1929
 Professor of Education at McGill University, Montreal in Canada from 1929 to 1934
 World Tour of Western Canada, Australia and New Zealand sponsored by the Carnegie Corporation 1935
 Adviser to Overseas Students at the Institute of Education in the University of London 1935 
 Third Director of the Institute of Education in the University of London between 1936 and 1945 when retired
 In retirement, reverted to being Adviser to Overseas Students at the Institute of Education in the University of London

Public service

Committee evidence 
Clarke contributed to the Spens Report (1938) with a memorandum on influences affecting secondary curricula in the dominions where he expounded his understanding based both on his time as professor of education in both Canada & South Africa, his world tour of 1935 and time advising overseas students. Clarke also gave evidence to the Norwood committee.

McNair committee 
Prior to the Education Act of 1944 (known as the Butler Act), when the Board of Education was still in operation, Clarke served on the McNair committee under the chairmanship of Sir Arnold McNair to consider the supply, recruitment and training of teachers and youth leaders.  Controversially, the committee split on the key recommendations regarding the ideal organisation for training teachers, whereby Clarke and half the committee supported Universities providing teacher training whereas the chair and the other half of the committee supported a continued role for teacher training colleges. Clarke's argument for universities hinged on the synergy between university research into pedagogy and the training of teachers so research was improved and teacher training was always abreast of the latest ideas. The counter argument for training colleges, especially those attached to schools was that training was more practical and hands-on.

Central advisory council for education (England) 
After the Education Act of 1944 brought the Ministry of Education into force, Fred Clarke was appointed as the first chairman of the Central Advisory Council for Education (England), where he played a role guiding post-war education policy for the new Ministry.  During his tenure, two inquiries were carried out and with the resulting reports known as the Clarke Reports: -
 School and Life (1947)
 Out of School (1948)
The Clarke Report 1948 (Out of School) recommended an expansion of municipal facilities for children which most people today have enjoyed during their childhood, including: - libraries encouraging children by stocking children's books and later innovations like reading corners, playgrounds with equipment such as slides, swings and roundabouts, public swimming pools and sports playing fields.

Other public service roles 
Clarke also undertook numerous advisory and committee roles with, for example the National Union of Teachers, the British Council and the establishment of the National Foundation for Educational Research.

Bibliography 
Following Sir Fred Clarke's death, his bibliography was written then published in 1967 by Frank W. Mitchell, it was titled; Sir Fred Clarke: Master-Teacher 1880-1952 (London: Longmans, 1967).

Fred Clarke's daughter Claudia Clarke effectively produced an 'early years' addendum to Mitchell's Bibliography in 2005 with the publication of Sir Fred Clarke: a Reappraisal of his early years 1880 - 1911. Claudia stated that Fred Clarke's widow, Edith Clarke restricted Mitchell's access to his private papers so there was little information on Fred Clarke's early years, the likely reason for this was to keep secret, a convict in the family who was transported to Australia.  After Edith's death, Claudia gained access to the papers and published in the Journal; - Education Research and Perspectives, Vol. 33, No. 1, 2006.

Clarke's personal papers are now held at the Institute of Education Library and Archives, University College London

Published works

Books 

 1909 - A School History of Hampshire
 1923 - Essays in the Politics of Education
 1929 - The foundations of history teaching, a critique for teachers
 1940 - Education and Social Change: An English Interpretation
 1948 - Freedom in the Educative Society

Journals 
Sir Fred Clarke was a prolific writer of articles in educational journals, mainly  aimed at professional readers on topics such as the training of teachers, the history of education, critiques of educational theories, and opinions on government policies towards education: -

The Educational News, Cape Town, South Africa 

 1911 - A Word on Training
 1911 - School and Training College 
 1912 - The Evolution of Educational Theory
 1912 - An Possit Praecepto Salvus Esse!
 1912 - The History of Education - 'Cui Bono'!
 1912 - Montessoriana
 1913 - The Russell. Memorandum
 1914 - From Locke to Montessori
 1914 - The Syndicalist in Education (in 2 parts)
 1915 - The 'History' Question
 1915 - The School of Shakespeare's Day
 1915 - Educational Outlook
 1916 - Letter; "What is a Teacher?"
 1916 - Letter; "Matriculation under the New University Scheme"
 1916 - Education and Labour (in two parts)
 1919 - Presidential Address (South African Teachers Association)
 1919 - Training of Teachers -· Departments Proposals (in two parts)
 1920 - The Salaries Commission
 1920 - Professional Status of the Teacher
 1920 - Presidential Address (South African Teachers Association)
 1921 - Letter; "Greetings and Prophecies
 1923 - Education and Society
 1923 - Letter; Reply to Mr. Earle of Rhodes University, re. Teachers' Higher Diploma of the University of South Africa
 1925 - The Imperial Mind (book review)
 1925 - An Introduction to Psychology (book review)
 1926 - Secondary School Courses
 1926 - History in the Primary School (six articles)
 1927 - Impressions of the Imperial Education Conference (in London)
 1928 - The Question of Medium (plus a subsequent reply to criticism to this article) 
 1928 - Letter; "Conference and the Training of Teachers"
 1928 - The Philosophical Bases of Education (book review)
 1928 -  Educational Psychology (book review)
 1928 - Seen from the Threshold
 1929 - Valedictory Letter to Conference (South African Teachers Association)

The Hibbert Journal; A Quarterly Review of Religion, Theology and Philosophy 

 1927 - An Elementary-Secondary School
 1928 - English Mind and Dominion Mind
 1929 - Education and the New English
 1930 - Community; - An Estimate of the vital Principle of English Education
 1932 - The Mature Significance of  'New' Countries

The Teachers' Magazine, Quebec, Montreal, P.Q. 

 1930 - Some First Impressions (Vol. XIII) 
 1930 - Notes on Education in the Province of Quebec (Vol. XIII)
 1930 - Training the High School Teacher:  Developments and Possibilities in Quebec (Vol. XIII)
 1932 - A Graduate Year of Training for High School Teachers (Vol. XIV)
 1933 - Saving Democracy (Vol. XV)
 1935 - Retrospect (Vol. XVII)
 1936 - The State Master or Servant (Vol. XVIII)

The New Era 

 1927 - New Education in Africa
 1931 - British Commonwealth - Disintegration or Mutual Understanding
 1932 - The Key to To-morrow-I, The Reconstruction of Discipline
 1934 - The New Countries in Education
 1936 - The State: Master or Servant
 1940 - Now and Tomorrow: Planned Freedom
 1941 - A Note on the  Exploratory Years
 1942 - Cultural Aspects of Vocational Education

Citations

References 
GOVERNMENT REPORTS
 
 
 
 
 
BOOKS
 
 
 
 
 
BIBLIOGRAPHY

 

 
THESIS

 
 

JOURNALS

 
 
 
 
 
 
 

1880 births
1952 deaths
Educational reformers
English educational theorists
Academics of the UCL Institute of Education
Knights Bachelor